Shantel Swedlund Krebs (born April 28, 1973) is an American businesswoman and former South Dakota Secretary of State. She previously served in the South Dakota House of Representatives and South Dakota Senate.

Early life and education 
Shantel Krebs was born in South Dakota and graduated from Arlington High School in Arlington, South Dakota, in 1991.

Krebs attended Dakota State University in Madison, South Dakota, where she graduated with a bachelor's degree in business administration.  A lifelong South Dakotan, Krebs was honored as a Dakota State University distinguished alumnus and was commencement speaker for DSU graduation in December, 2022.

Business career 
Shantel has owned and operated retail businesses in downtown Sioux Falls. Before that, she worked in the healthcare industry. She is currently a founding partner with Avera Health and Southeast Technical Institute of the Avera Academy.  She serves as administrator for the program that trains high school students for career opportunities in the healthcare field. From 2019-2023 Krebs was also board chair and Chief Executive Officer of The Miss America Organization.

Political career
Krebs represented the 10th district of the South Dakota Legislature from 2005 to 2015, serving in the House of Representatives from 2005-2011 and in the Senate from 2011-2015. Krebs was elected to majority whip posts in both chambers and was chairwoman of the Transportation committee in the House and the Agriculture & Natural Resources committee in the Senate. She also served on the Senate Health and Human services committee.  Her district included Lincoln County and Minnehaha County.

Secretary of state 
Shantel was elected to the office of South Dakota Secretary of State in 2014, and sworn in on January 2, 2015.

Krebs ran unsuccessfully in the 2018 election for South Dakota's at-large congressional seat in the Republican primary.

Personal life
Shantel Krebs, then known as Shantel Swedlund, won Miss South Dakota 1997 and competed in the Miss America 1998 competition. She resides in Canton, SD with her husband, former TV news anchor Mitch Krebs. In 2016, Krebs gained media attention when she shot a rattlesnake on her back patio of her home outside Fort Pierre.

On June 5, 2019, Krebs, a board member of the Miss America Organization, replaced former Miss America 1989 and former Fox News personality Gretchen Carlson as Chairperson of the Miss America Organization.Krebs was inducted into the South Dakota Hall of Fame on September 10, 2022.

Electoral history

References

External links
South Dakota Legislature - Representative Shantel Krebs official SD House website
Project Vote Smart - Representative Shantel Krebs (SD) profile
Follow the Money - Shantel Krebs
2006 2004 2002 campaign contributions

 

|-

1973 births
21st-century American politicians
21st-century American women politicians
American beauty pageant winners
American Lutherans
Living people
Miss America 1998 delegates
Secretaries of State of South Dakota
Republican Party members of the South Dakota House of Representatives
People from De Smet, South Dakota
Women state legislators in South Dakota
Beauty queen-politicians